Operation Menai Bridge is the code name for plans related to the death of King Charles III. The name refers to a suspension bridge in Wales.

It is the funeral plan for King Charles III. The plan includes the announcement of his death, the period of official mourning, and the details of his state funeral.

Planning for the King's funeral began almost immediately after the funeral for his mother, Queen Elizabeth II.

Background
When King George VI died, it was communicated by using the phrase "Hyde Park Corner", to avoid Buckingham Palace switchboard operators learning the news too soon. For Queen Elizabeth, The Queen Mother, Operation Tay Bridge was put into motion upon her death. For the death of Prince Philip, Duke of Edinburgh the code name was Operation Forth Bridge, and for Queen Elizabeth II, the code word was "London Bridge is down". Since Elizabeth II died at Balmoral Castle in Scotland, Operation Unicorn (Scotland) was put into effect upon her death.

References

Charles III
Death customs